John Maurice Campbell Plane,  is a British atmospheric chemist, currently Professor of Atmospheric Chemistry at the University of Leeds. His research investigates planetary atmospheres using a range of theoretical and experimental techniques.

Early life and career 

Plane was born in South Africa. He took an MA (1979) and a PhD (1983) at the University of Cambridge, where he also held a research fellowship. Later, he held academic appointments at the University of Miami and the University of East Anglia, before moving to the University of Leeds.

Research interests 

Plane's research focuses on understanding the chemistry of planetary atmospheres (including Earth's) involving a combination of laboratory techniques (kinetics and photochemistry), atmospheric measurements (in situ and satellite remote sensing), and modelling at different scales. His research group studies four main areas: Earth's mesosphere (middle and upper atmosphere) and troposphere (lower atmosphere), the atmospheres of other planets, and interstellar chemistry (such as the formation of stardust). Plane is particularly noted for his work on the chemistry of metals that ablate ("erode") from cosmic dust particles, such as meteoroids, as they enter the atmosphere. He is an expert on mesospheric metal chemistry, a pioneer of Differential Optical Absorption Spectroscopy (DOAS), and one of the developers of tropospheric iodine chemistry - a means of studying the composition of Earth's atmosphere. He has authored over 240 peer-reviewed papers.

Awards 

Plane has received numerous honors and awards, including the Royal Society of Chemistry prize in Reaction Kinetics and Mechanisms (2005), a Royal Society of Chemistry Tilden Prize Lectureship (2006) ("for his outstanding contributions to our understanding of the chemistry of the troposphere and mesosphere through field measurements, laboratory experiments and theory"), the National Science Foundation CEDAR (Coupling, Energetics, and Dynamics of Atmospheric Regions) Lecture Prize (2007), and the European Geosciences Union Vilhelm Bjerknes Medal (2017) ("in recognition of his groundbreaking work in atmospheric chemistry"). He was elected a Fellow of the American Geophysical Union in 2017. He is also a Fellow of the Royal Society of Chemistry and a Fellow of the Royal Astronomical Society, and was elected a Fellow of the Royal Society in 2020.

Selected publications

References

External links
 

Year of birth missing (living people)
Living people
Alumni of St John's College, Cambridge
Academics of the University of East Anglia
Academics of the University of Leeds
British chemists